Aleksei Konstantinovich Antonnikov (born 5 December 1983) is a former Russian professional football player.

Club career
He played two seasons in the Russian Football National League for FC Nosta Novotroitsk and FC Salyut-Energia Belgorod.

References

External links
 

1983 births
People from Vsevolozhsky District
Living people
Russian footballers
Association football midfielders
FC Salyut Belgorod players
FC Tyumen players
FC Khimki players
FC Zenit-Izhevsk players
FC Lukhovitsy players
FC Nosta Novotroitsk players
Sportspeople from Leningrad Oblast